Kork and Nartich Rural District is a rural district (dehestan) in the Central District of Bam County, Kerman Province, Iran. At the 2006 census, its population was 9,216, in 2,519 families. The rural district has 21 villages.

References 

Rural Districts of Kerman Province
Bam County